America West Express was the brand name for America West Airlines commuter and regional flights operated by Mesa Air Group's Mesa Airlines under a code share agreement. Today Mesa Airlines operates for American Eagle.

Mesa Airlines operated America West Express from hubs at Sky Harbor International Airport in Phoenix, Arizona and McCarran International Airport in Las Vegas, Nevada to regional destinations.

Chautauqua Airlines also operated America West Express regional jet service via a code sharing agreement in support of the America West hub in Columbus, Ohio.

America West Express fleet consisted of 61 turboprop and regional jet aircraft.

History

America West Express started as a regional carrier in association with America West Airlines with a hub at Sky Harbor International Airport in Phoenix, Arizona. The name "America West Express" was taken from the old America West Airlines cargo service which had begun in 1985.
America West initially operated de Havilland Canada DHC-8 Dash 8 turboprop aircraft with its own flight crews; however, on November 30, 1992, America West signed a codeshare agreement with Mesa Airlines to operate America West Airlines' regional and commuter services as America West Express.
  
In the mid-1990s, with the opening of the America West Airlines hub at Port Columbus International Airport in Columbus, Ohio,  America West Airlines used Chautauqua Airlines to provide Embraer ERJ-145 regional jet service to feed the hub.  When the Columbus hub was shut down, the Chautauqua Airlines code share was discontinued, leaving Mesa as the sole operator of AW Express services.

In 2003, America West greatly increased the size of their express operation by starting new routes operated by regional jets from its hub at McCarran International Airport in Las Vegas, Nevada.

In 2007, America West Express was branded as US Airways Express following the merger of America West with US Airways.

Destinations

Operators and fleet

Fleet

Historical regional jet fleet

The America West Express brand, through its various regional and commuter airline partners, operated other twinjet aircraft over the years besides the Bombardier (Canadair) regional jet aircraft including the following types:

 Embraer ERJ-145
 Fokker 70

Historical turboprop fleet

The America West Express brand, through its various regional and commuter airline partners, operated a variety of twin turboprop aircraft over the years including the following types:

 Beechcraft 1900D
 Bombardier Q200
 Embraer EMB-120 Brasilia

Services
America West Express operated all of its fleet in a single coach class configuration. However, the CRJ-700s and CRJ-900s did offer dual class service at one point with separate first and coach class cabins. This was dual class service was then subsequently dropped when it was determined that customers were not willing to pay extra for limited first class amenities on these short flights.  Increasing the number of coach seats thus resulted in increased revenue.

Identifying codes 
Since these were code share flights, the America West Airlines codes were used for customer purposes.  HPX indicates America West Express flights.  However, the flights were actually operated under the Mesa Airlines codes.

References

External links

 America West Airlines website
 Mesa Airlines website

Defunct regional airline brands
Defunct regional airlines of the United States
America West Holdings
Defunct airlines of the United States
Airlines based in Arizona